is a passenger railway station located in the city of Kunitachi, Tokyo, operated by East Japan Railway Company (JR East).

Lines 
It is 33.0 kilometers from the terminus of the Nambu Line at Kawasaki Station.

Station layout
Yaho Station has two opposed ground-level side platforms serving two tracks, with an elevated station build above and across the platforms. The station is staffed.

Platforms

History
The station opened on 11 December 1929. With the privatization of JNR on 1 April 1987, the station came under the control of JR East.

Passenger statistics
In fiscal 2019, the station was used by an average of 10,390 passengers daily (boarding passengers only).

Surrounding area
The area around the station is known for the Yaho Tenman-gū shrine, which is a short walk from the station.

See also
List of railway stations in Japan

References

External links

 JR East station information 

Nambu Line
Railway stations in Tokyo
Stations of East Japan Railway Company
Railway stations in Japan opened in 1929
Kunitachi, Tokyo